A Hound For Trouble is a 1951 Warner Bros. Merrie Melodies cartoon short directed by Chuck Jones. The cartoon was released on April 28, 1951, and features Charlie Dog.

The film has Charlie attempt to take over a restaurant in Pisa, while its owner is on a short break. Charlie's behavior drives away a customer. The restaurant's owner eventually seems to accept Charlie as a partner, but he actually uses the dog's newfound trust to fool him.

Plot
After being found on a shipping boat in the coast of Italy, Charlie is found by the ship's owner (who thought he kicked him off earlier) and is kicked off (again). Trying to find a new 'master', Charlie keeps asking people in English, but they keep responding 'no capisce' ("I don't understand"). Charlie eventually spots a restaurant owner opening his shop and makes himself at home (the shop owner actually speaking English) before being kicked out of the restaurant.

As he returns, Charlie sees that the owner has gone out for 15 minutes ("15 minootsa") and decides to run the restaurant himself. Charlie first enrages the one customer who comes in.  The customer orders "Na Bella Piatta Del Una Cacciatore Di Tetrazzini Cu Ragù Di Marinara Di La Piazza Rigotini Mozzarella Fina". Charlie tells him that they're out of this, so the customer orders the spaghetti instead. Charlie, after feeding him spaghetti from a spool, serves grape juice he presses with his feet in front of the customer, causing the customer to rush out, sickened. When the shop owner returns, Charlie tries to convince the owner that they need a 'floor show' (singing "Atsa Matta for You?"). The owner finally appears to relent and starts walking Charlie home.

The owner suddenly yells that the Tower of Pisa (which Charlie, being unfamiliar with the monument, does not realize is perpetually leaning) is "about to fall on that little house!" The owner then has Charlie hold up the tower while he 'calls for help' (instead just going back to his restaurant). Charlie is left 'holding up' the tower, calling out for help and asking "Doesn't anyone around here capice?!"

Voice cast
Mel Blanc as Charlie Dog, Pizzeria Owner
Michael Maltese as Customer (uncredited)

References

External links
 
 

1951 animated films
1951 short films
1951 films
Short films directed by Chuck Jones
Merrie Melodies short films
Animated films about dogs
Films set in Pisa
Films set in restaurants
1950s Warner Bros. animated short films
Films with screenplays by Michael Maltese
Films scored by Carl Stalling
1950s English-language films
Charlie Dog films